Multiconsult is an engineering consultancy with 2800 employees operating in Norway, elsewhere in Europe and globally. The company is listed on the Oslo Stock Exchange.

In addition to its headquarters in Oslo, Multiconsult has local offices in several Norwegian cities. Multiconsult also operates elsewhere in Europe, Africa and Asia. In 2015, Multiconsult acquired Link Arkitektur, one of the largest architecture firms in Scandinavia.

History
Multiconsults traces its origins from the founding of Norsk Vandbygningskontor (NVK) in 1908. NVK merged with Multiconsult in 2003. The name of Multiconsult stems from 1974 when Sivilingeniørene Apeland & Mjøset AS was reorganised and Stiftelsen Multiconsult became a major shareholder.

References

External links 

 

Construction and civil engineering companies of Norway
Companies based in Oslo
Construction and civil engineering companies established in 1973
Companies listed on the Oslo Stock Exchange
International engineering consulting firms
Geotechnical engineering companies
Norwegian companies established in 1973
Norwegian companies established in 1908
Construction and civil engineering companies established in 1908